George Tate Blackstock (1 April 1856 – 27 December 1921) was a lawyer born in Newcastle, Upper Canada.

Blackstock was a leading civil and criminal lawyer in Toronto. He handled many prominent cases, both as a defense lawyer and as a Crown prosecutor.

References 

 

Lawyers in Ontario
1856 births
1921 deaths